Michal Ďuriš (born 1 June 1988) is a Slovak professional footballer who plays as a forward for Cypriot club Karmiotissa.

Club career
Ďuriš joined Banská Bystrica from ŠK Petrochema Dubová when he was 14. After three years playing for youth squads he made his debut in the Slovak top-level football league featuring in his club's 2–0 defeat against Ružomberok on 9 November 2005. During five seasons for Dukla he scored 18 goals in 114 matches overall.

In August 2010, he signed on a one-year loan for Viktoria Plzeň of the Czech Czech First League with an option of a permanent stay. He debuted for Plzeň in a 3–0 away win against České Budějovice on 28 August 2010. In his first season for Plzeň he won the Czech title, the first title in Plzeň's history. He scored two goals for Plzeň in the 2011–12 UEFA Champions League campaign, one in a 2–1 play-off win against Copenhagen and the next in a 2–2 group stage draw against Milan.

On 26 January 2017, he signed a deal with the Russian Premier League side FC Orenburg.

On 17 January 2018, he joined Anorthosis Famagusta on a half-season loan. On 6 July 2018, the transfer became permanent for an estimated fee of €600,000.

International career
Ďuriš made his debut for the national team in the 3–1 away win over Denmark in a friendly match that was held on 15 August 2012.

He scored his first two goals after 20 matches against Switzerland, on 13 November 2015 during a 3–2 victory, with third goal scored by Róbert Mak. Four days later, on 17 November, he netted third goal of a game, during a 3–1 victory over Iceland, with first two goals provided by Mak, again.

Ďuriš scored his fourth goal against Germany in a friendly match in Augsburg, giving Slovakia the 2–1 lead in the pre-EURO 2016 friendly match, which was his 25th cap. Slovakia eventually defeated Germany 3–1. Duris also scored the winning goal for Slovakia in extra-time against Northern Ireland, sending Slovakia to UEFA Euro 2020, where they will be placed in Group E.

On 18 May 2021, Ďuriš was included in the final 26-man squad to represent Slovakia at the rescheduled UEFA Euro 2020 tournament.

On 24 August 2021, national team manager Štefan Tarkovič announced Ďuriš's retirement from international duties. Ďuriš retired with 59 appearances and 7 goals, including appearances at two European Championships.

Career statistics

Club

International

Scores and results list Slovakia's goal tally first, score column indicates score after each Ďuriš goal.

Honours
Viktoria Plzeň
Czech First League: 2010–11, 2012–13, 2015–16
Czech Supercup: 2011, 2015

AC Omonia
Cypriot First Division: 2020–21
Cypriot Super Cup: 2021

Slovakia
King's Cup: 2018

References

External links
 Viktoria Plzeň profile 
 
 

1988 births
Living people
People from Uherské Hradiště
Slovak footballers
Slovak expatriate footballers
Slovakia youth international footballers
Slovakia under-21 international footballers
Slovakia international footballers
Association football forwards
FK Dukla Banská Bystrica players
FC Viktoria Plzeň players
FK Mladá Boleslav players
FC Orenburg players
Anorthosis Famagusta F.C. players
AC Omonia players
Ethnikos Achna FC players
Karmiotissa FC players
Slovak Super Liga players
Czech First League players
Russian Premier League players
Cypriot First Division players
UEFA Euro 2016 players
UEFA Euro 2020 players
Expatriate footballers in the Czech Republic
Expatriate footballers in Russia
Expatriate footballers in Cyprus
Slovak expatriate sportspeople in the Czech Republic
Slovak expatriate sportspeople in Russia
Slovak expatriate sportspeople in Cyprus
Sportspeople from the Zlín Region